Karina Andrea Koch Benvenuto (born 26 April 1985) is a Chilean former tennis player.

In her career, Koch Benvenuto won 14 singles and 19 doubles titles on the ITF Circuit. On 11 June 2012, she reached her best singles ranking of world No. 224, and peaked at No. 289 in the doubles rankings.

Playing for Chile at the Fed Cup, Koch Benvenuto has a win–loss record of 41–32.

ITF Circuit finals

Singles: 26 (14 titles, 12 runner-ups)

Doubles: 34 (19 titles, 15 runner-ups)

Notes

References

External links
 
 
 

1985 births
Living people
Tennis players from Santiago
Chilean female tennis players
Tennis players at the 2007 Pan American Games
Tennis players at the 2011 Pan American Games
Tennis players at the 2015 Pan American Games
Pan American Games silver medalists for Chile
Chilean people of German descent
Pan American Games medalists in tennis
South American Games bronze medalists for Chile
South American Games medalists in tennis
Competitors at the 2014 South American Games
Medalists at the 2011 Pan American Games
21st-century Chilean women